A skid row is a part of a city known for high vagrancy and poor maintenance.

Skid Row may also refer to:

Music
 Skid Row (Irish band), 1960s blues-rock band
 Skid Row (American band), American heavy metal band
 Skid Row (Skid Row album), 1989
 Skid Row (James Ferraro album), 2015
 Nirvana (band), former name Skid Row
 "Skid Row (Downtown)", a song in the musical Little Shop of Horrors

Other uses
 Confessions of a Vice Baron, a 1943 American film reissued as Skid Row
 Skid Row, Los Angeles, a neighborhood in Los Angeles, California
 SKIDROW, a software cracking group

See also
 Skid (album), by the Irish band Skid Row